 
Orange County Fire Department may refer to:

 Orange County Fire Authority - The fire department for Orange County, California. 
 Orange County Fire Rescue - The fire department for Orange County, Florida.